The  First  Anglo-Sikh War was fought between the Sikh Empire and the British East India Company in 1845 and 1846 in and around the Ferozepur district of Punjab. It resulted in defeat and partial subjugation of the Sikh empire and cession of Jammu and Kashmir as a separate princely state under British suzerainty.

Background and causes of the war
The Sikh kingdom of Punjab was expanded and consolidated by Maharajah Ranjit Singh during the early years of the nineteenth century, about the same time as the British-controlled territories were advanced by conquest or annexation to the borders of the Punjab. Ranjit Singh maintained a policy of wary friendship with the British, ceding some territory south of the Sutlej River, while at the same time building up his military forces both to deter aggression by the British and to wage war against the Afghans. He hired American and European mercenary soldiers to train his army, and also incorporated contingents of Hindus and Muslims into his army.

Events in the Punjab

Maharaja Ranjit Singh died in 1839. After his death, his kingdom began to fall into disorder. Ranjit's unpopular legitimate son, Kharak Singh, was removed from power within a few months, and later died in prison under mysterious circumstances. It was widely believed that he was poisoned. He was replaced by his able but estranged son Kanwar Nau Nihal Singh, who also died within a few months in suspicious circumstances, after being injured by a falling archway at the Lahore Fort while returning from his father's cremation. At the time, two major factions within the Punjab were contending for power and influence; the Sikh Sindhanwalias and the Hindu Dogras. Sher Singh was crowned Maharaja of the Sikh Empire in January 1841, with Dhian Singh Dogra as his prime minister.

The army expanded rapidly in the aftermath of Ranjit Singh's death, from 29,000 (with 192 guns) in 1839 to over 80,000 in 1845 as landlords and their retainers took up arms. It proclaimed itself to be the embodiment of the Sikh nation. Its regimental panchayats (committees) formed an alternative power source within the kingdom, declaring that Guru Gobind Singh's ideal of the Sikh commonwealth had been revived, with the Sikhs as a whole assuming all executive, military and civil authority in the state, which British observers decried as a "dangerous military democracy". British representatives and visitors in the Punjab described the regiments as preserving "puritanical" order internally, but also as being in a perpetual state of mutiny or rebellion against the central Durbar (court).

Maharajah Sher Singh was unable to meet the pay demands of the army, although he reportedly lavished funds on a degenerate court. In September 1843 he was murdered by his cousin, an officer of the army, Ajit Singh Sindhanwalia. The Dogras took their revenge on those responsible, and Jind Kaur, Ranjit Singh's youngest widow, became regent for her infant son Duleep Singh. After the vizier Hira Singh was killed, while attempting to flee the capital with loot from the royal treasury (toshkana), by troops under Sham Singh Attariwala, Jind Kaur's brother Jawahar Singh became vizier in December 1844. In 1845 he arranged the assassination of Pashaura Singh, who presented a threat to Duleep Singh. For this, he was called to account by the army. Despite attempts to bribe the army he was butchered in September 1845 in the presence of Jind Kaur and Duleep Singh.

Jind Kaur publicly vowed revenge against her brother's murderers. She remained regent. Lal Singh became vizier, and Tej Singh became commander of the army. Sikh historians have stressed that both these men were prominent in the Dogra faction. Originally Hindus from outside of Punjab, both had converted to Sikhism in 1818.

British actions
Immediately after the death of Ranjit Singh, the British East India Company had begun increasing its military strength, particularly in the regions adjacent to the Punjab, establishing a military cantonment at Ferozepur, only a few miles from the Sutlej River which marked the frontier between British-ruled India and the Punjab. In 1843, they conquered and annexed Sindh, to the south of the Punjab, in a move which many British people regarded as cynical and ignoble. This did not gain the British any respect in the Punjab and increased suspicions of British motives.

The actions and attitudes of the British, under Governor General Lord Ellenborough and his successor, Sir Henry Hardinge, are disputed. By most British accounts, their main concern was that the Sikh army, without strong leadership to restrain them, was a serious threat to British territories along the border. Sikh and Indian historians have countered that the military preparations made by these Governor-Generals were offensive in nature; for example, they prepared bridging trains (prefabricated bridges) and siege gun batteries, which would be unlikely to be required in a purely defensive operation.

Nevertheless, the unconcealed and seemingly aggressive British military build-up at the borders had the effect of increasing tension within the Punjab and the Sikh Army.

Outbreak of war

After mutual demands and accusations between the Sikh Durbar and the East India Company, diplomatic relations were broken. An East India Company army began marching towards Ferozepur, where a division was already stationed. This army was commanded by Sir Hugh Gough, the Commander in Chief of the Bengal Army, and was accompanied by Sir Henry Hardinge, the British Governor General of Bengal, who placed himself beneath Gough in the military chain of command. The British East India Company forces consisted of formations of the Bengal Army, with usually one British unit to every three or four Bengal infantry or cavalry units. Most of the artillery on the British side consisted of light guns from the elite Bengal Horse Artillery.

The Sikh Army at that time was led by General Raja Lal Singh who, with Tej Singh, betrayed the Sikhs during the course of the war. The two generals were regularly supplying information and even receiving instructions from British officers.

In response to the British move, the Sikh army began crossing the Sutlej on 11 December 1845. Although the leaders and principal units of the army were Sikhs, there were also Punjabi, Pakhtun and Kashmiri infantry units. The artillery consisted mainly of units of heavy guns, which had been organised and trained by European mercenaries.

The Sikhs claimed they were only moving into Sikh possessions (specifically the village of Moran, whose ownership was disputed) on the east side of the river, but the move was regarded by the British as clearly hostile and they declared war.

Course of the war

Ladwa battles

Battle of Wadni Fort

After Raja Gurdit Singh's death, his son Ajit Singh succeeded him. Ajit Singh upgraded his fort at Ladwa to face the danger of the British. During the First Sikh war in 1845, he fought on the side of the Sikh army against the British. He was defeated.  The Sikh defenders of Wudnee surrendered on 30 December after the Sikh defeat at Ferozeshah prevented the Sikh army reinforcing them.

Battle of Phillaur Fort

This battle was the last fought by the Raja of Ladwa (alt. spelt as "Ladva"), Ajit Singh. The fort was designed by Dewan Mohkam Chand, with the assistance of Ranjit Singh's French and Italian generals. It was constructed as a response to the British, who built Lodhi fort in nearby Ludhiana. The fort's architecture has a distinct European character, with channels dug out along the boundary of the fort, watchtowers on the two gateways, four bastions on four nooks and high walls around the fort. Ajit Singh of Ladwa won this battle due to this fort. He surrendered after seeing that he was no match for the British.

Lahore battles

Battle of Mudki

An army under Tej Singh crossed the Sutlej and advanced against the British outpost at Ferozepur, although they did not attempt to attack or surround it. Another force under Lal Singh clashed with Gough's and Hardinge's advancing army at the Battle of Mudki late on 18 December. The British won an untidy encounter battle, suffering heavy casualties.

Battle of Ferozeshah

On the next day, Gough's army came in sight of the large Sikh entrenchment at Ferozeshah. Gough wished to attack at once, but Hardinge used his position as Governor General to overrule him and order him to wait for the division from Ferozepur to arrive. When they appeared late on 21 December, Gough attacked in the few hours of daylight left. The well-served Sikh artillery caused heavy casualties among the British, and their infantry fought desperately. On the other hand, the elite of the Sikh army, the irregular cavalry or ghodachadas (alt. gorracharra, horse-mounted), were comparatively ineffective against Gough's infantry and cavalry as they had been kept from the battlefield by Lal Singh.

By nightfall, some of Gough's army had fought their way into the Sikh positions, but other units had been driven back in disorder. Hardinge expected a defeat on the following day and ordered the state papers at Mudki to be burned in this event. However, on the following morning, the British and Bengal Army units rallied and drove the Sikhs from the rest of their fortifications. Lal Singh had made no effort to rally or reorganise his army.

At this point, Tej Singh's army appeared. Once again, Gough's exhausted army faced defeat and disaster, but Tej Singh inexplicably withdrew, claiming that British cavalry and artillery which were withdrawing to replenish ammunition were actually making an outflanking move.

Operations temporarily halted, mainly because Gough's army was exhausted and required rest and reinforcements.

Battle of Baddowal
Ranjur Singh Majithia was the son of Desa Singh Majithia, one of the most able ministers under Maharaja Ranjit Singh. He commanded a large army, (10,000 infantry and some regular cavalry with sixty guns) and crossed the Sutlej in force and was joined by Ajit Singh of Ladwa. They marched towards Ludhiana and burned a portion of the British cantonment. Sir Harry Smith (afterwards Governor of Cape Colony), who was sent to relieve Ludhiana, marched eastwards from Ferozepur, keeping a few miles away from the Sutlej.

On learning of the Sikh strength, and receiving further orders from Gough, Smith instead force-marched his troops via Jagraon, collecting a British regiment there, to reach Ludhiana ahead of the Sikh main body. On 21 January, as he left Baddowal, the Sikh irregular cavalry (the Gorchurras) continually attacked his rearguards. They captured most of Smith's baggage animals (mules, bullocks and elephants), and cut down any straggling troops. Nevertheless, Smith succeeded in reaching Ludhiana, with his troops exhausted. A brigade of troops from Delhi, including two Gurkha battalions, reinforced him.

Battle of Aliwal 

After resting his troops, Smith once again advanced to Baddowal. The Sikhs had withdrawn to Aliwal on the Sutlej, awaiting reinforcements. On 28 January, Smith advanced against them, cautiously at first. Finding a weak point in the Sikh position, he won a model victory which eliminated the Sikh bridgehead and captured almost all Ranjur Singh's artillery and his army's baggage and equipment.

Battle of Sobraon

The Sikhs had been temporarily dismayed by their defeats and by their commanders' inaction, but rallied when fresh units and leaders, including Sham Singh Attariwala, joined them, and Maharani Jind Kaur exhorted 500 selected officers to make renewed efforts.

Gough had intended to attack the Sikh army in its entrenchments at Sobraon as soon as Smith's division rejoined from Ludhiana, but Hardinge forced him to wait until a heavy artillery train had arrived. At last, he moved forward early on 10 February. The start of the battle was delayed by heavy fog, but as it lifted, 35 British heavy guns and howitzers opened fire. The Sikh cannon replied. The bombardment went on for two hours without much effect on the Sikh defences. Gough was told that his heavy guns were running short of ammunition and is alleged to have replied, "Thank God! Then I'll be at them with the bayonet."

Two British divisions under Harry Smith and Major General Sir Walter Gilbert made feint attacks on the Sikh left, while another division under Major General Robert Henry Dick made the main attack on the Sikh right, where the defences were of soft sand and were lower and weaker than the rest of the line. (It is believed that Lal Singh had supplied this information to Major Henry Lawrence, the Political Agent at Gough's headquarters.) Nevertheless, Dick's division was driven back by Sikh counter-attacks after initially gaining footholds within the Sikh lines. Dick himself was killed. As the British fell back, some frenzied Sikh soldiers attacked British wounded left in the ditch in front of the entrenchments, enraging the British soldiers.

The British, Gurkhas and Bengal regiments renewed their attacks along the entire front of the entrenchment, and broke through at several points. On the vulnerable Sikh right, engineers blew a breach in the fortifications and British cavalry and horse artillery pushed through it to engage the Sikhs in the centre of their position. Tej Singh had left the battlefield early. It is alleged in many Sikh accounts that he deliberately weakened the pontoon bridge, casting loose the boat at its centre, or that he ordered his own artillery on the west bank to fire on the bridge on the pretext of preventing British pursuit. British accounts claim that the bridge simply broke under the weight of the numbers of soldiers trying to retreat across it, having been weakened by the swollen river. Whichever account is correct, the bridge broke, trapping nearly 20,000 of the Sikh Khalsa Army on the east bank.

None of the trapped Sikh soldiers attempted to surrender. Many detachments, including one led by Sham Singh Attariwala, fought to the death. Some Sikhs rushed forward to attack the British regiments sword in hand; others tried to ford or swim the river. British horse artillery lined the bank of the river and continued to fire into the crowds in the water. By the time the firing ceased, the Sikhs had lost between 8,000 and 10,000 men. The British had also captured 67 guns.

Kangra battles

Battle of Kangrah
This was the only battle fought between the Sikh forces of Kangra and the British. The British controlled the valley after defeating them and the fort.

Aftermath

In the Treaty of Lahore on 9 March 1846, the Sikhs were made to surrender the valuable region (the Jullundur Doab) between the Beas River and Sutlej River. The Lahore Durbar was also required to pay an indemnity of 15 million rupees. Because it could not readily raise this sum, it ceded Kashmir, Hazarah and all the forts, territories, rights and interests in the hill countries situated between the Rivers Beas and Indus to the East India Company, as equivalent to ten million of rupees. In a later separate arrangement (the Treaty of Amritsar), the Raja of Jammu, Gulab Singh, purchased Kashmir from the East India Company for a payment of 7.5 million rupees and was granted the title Maharaja of Jammu and Kashmir.

The estate of Ladwa, belonging to Ajit Singh who had fought against the British at Buddowal and Aliwal, was confiscated in 1846. "The Raja of Ladwa, with an estate of 10,000 pounds a year, almost openly avowed his treason, and, after a time, went over to the enemy (the British Raj) with all his troops and artillery", reads the Dispatch of the Governor General, sent to London on November 17, 1846. On September 22, 1847, through a ‘sanad’, the British awarded his house at Haridwar to the Raja of Patiala. Ajit Singh was taken into custody and sent as a prisoner to the Allahabad fort. He contrived to escape, after killing his keeper, and after long wanderings in hills, is supposed to have died in Kashmir. His children, who held in joint tenure eight villages along with Bhadour sardars, were dispatched by the British to these villages. Thus, the brave sons of Ladwa lost in obscurity have little trace except their fort and so their reminiscences.

Maharaja Duleep Singh remained ruler of the Punjab and at first his mother, Maharani Jindan Kaur, remained as Regent. However, the Durbar later requested that the British presence remain until the Maharaja attained the age of 16.  The British consented to this and on 16 December 1846, the Treaty of Bhyroval provided for the Maharani to be awarded a pension of 150,000 rupees and be replaced by a British resident in Lahore supported by a Council of Regency, with agents in other cities and regions. This effectively gave the East India Company control of the government.

Sikh historians have always maintained that, in order to retain their hold on power and maintain the figurehead rule of Duleep Singh, Lal Singh and Tej Singh embarked on the war with the deliberate intent of breaking their own army. In particular, Lal Singh was corresponding with a British political officer and betraying state and military secrets throughout the war.  Lal Singh's and Tej Singh's desertion of their armies and refusal to attack when opportunity offered seem inexplicable otherwise.

The Sikh empire was until then one of the few remaining kingdoms in India after the rise of the company and the fall of the Mughal empire. Although the Sikh Army was weakened by the war, resentment at British interference in the government led to the Second Anglo-Sikh War within three years.

See also
First Anglo-Sikh War Memorial

References

source
 
 
 
 
 
 
 
 
 

 A fictionalised description of the origins and course of the First Anglo-Sikh War (as well as various Sikh fortifications including breastworks) can be found in the comedy/adventure novel Flashman and the Mountain of Light by George MacDonald Fraser (1990).  However, the book's well-researched footnotes are a source for serious historical information and further reading, such as the memoirs of some of the principals involved.

External links

 World History Encyclopedia - First Anglo-Sikh War
 First Anglo-Sikh War 
 Anglo-Sikh Wars

First
Conflicts in 1845
Conflicts in 1846
Battles involving the Sikhs
Military history of British India
History of Sikhism
1845 in India
1846 in India